This is a list of monuments that are classified by the Moroccan ministry of culture around Oujda.

Monuments and sites in Oujda 

|}

References 

Oujda
Oujda